Fiona McKee (born 16 May 1985) is a former Canadian badminton player who competes in international level events. She is a double Pan Am badminton champion has competed in women's doubles with Valerie Loker and Charmaine Reid. She has also competed in the 2007 Pan American Games.

References

1985 births
Living people
Sportspeople from Toronto
Canadian female badminton players
Badminton players at the 2007 Pan American Games
Pan American Games medalists in badminton
Pan American Games silver medalists for Canada
Medalists at the 2007 Pan American Games